Astand-e Jadid (also Romanized as Astand-e Jadīd; also known as Astand, Estend and Istind) is a village in Shaskuh Rural District, Central District, Zirkuh County, South Khorasan Province, Iran. At the 2006 census, its population was 961, in 221 families.

References 

Populated places in Zirkuh County